Cathrine Grøndahl (born 4 May 1969) is a Norwegian poet. She made her literary début in 1993 with the poetry collection Riv ruskende rytmer, for which she was awarded the Tarjei Vesaas' debutantpris. Among her other poetry collections are I klem mellom natt og dag from 1996, Det har ingenting med kjærlighet å gjøre from 1998, and Lovsang from 2003.

References

1969 births
Writers from Oslo
20th-century Norwegian poets
Living people
Norwegian women poets
21st-century Norwegian poets
20th-century Norwegian women writers
21st-century Norwegian women writers